Aegle koekeritziana is a moth of the family Noctuidae. It is found on the Russian plain and in Hungary and Moldova. It is also present in Turkey, the Caucasus and Transcaucasia.

The wingspan is 20–26 mm. Adults are on wing from May to the end of August.

The larvae feed on Delphinium species. Pupation takes place in a spinning.

References

Literature
 Walter Forster & Theodor A. Wohlfahrt: Die Schmetterlinge Mitteleuropas - Bd.IV Eulen (Noctuidae), Franckh´sche Verlagsbuchhandlung, Stuttgart 1971

External links

 Funet
 Lepiforum e.V.
 noctuidae.de

Hadeninae
Moths described in 1799
Moths of Europe
Moths of Asia